Ko Ko (born 10 March 1956 in Mandalay, Burma) was the Minister for Home Affairs of Myanmar (Burma) from 2011 to 2016. He retired as a Lieutenant General on 30 March 2016 from the Myanmar Army.

References

Government ministers of Myanmar
Burmese military personnel
1956 births
People from Mandalay
Living people
Defence Services Academy alumni